Topsy-turvy means "upside down". It may also refer to:
Doll
A Topsy-Turvy doll is a double-ended doll, typically featuring two opposing characters.
Film
Topsy-Turvy, a 1999 musical-drama film portraying the creation of Gilbert and Sullivan's opera The Mikado.
Topsy Turvy (film), a 1927 Krazy Kat animated film
 Musical albums:
 Topsy-Turvy (2002), album by The Apex Theory (currently - Mt. Helium)
 Topsy Turvy by Young Fresh Fellows (1985)
 Topsy Turvy by Guitar Shorty (1993)
 Disney works:
 Topsy Turvy video (1996)
 "Topsy Turvy", song from 1996 film The Hunchback of Notre Dame
 Other media:
 "Topsy Turvey", first-season episode of The Batman
 "Topsy Turvy World", story arc in American animation Rocky and Bullwinkle

See also 
 Mr. Topsy-Turvy, Mr. Men character
 The Purchase of the North Pole or Topsy-Turvy, 1889 novel by Jules Verne
 The Topsy-Turvy World, AKA Netherlandish Proverbs, 1559 painting by Pieter Bruegel the Elder
 Topsyturveydom, a W. S. Gilbert comic opera (1874)